Sergei Georgievich Walter (also known as Serhij Valter; January 21, 1958 — February 25, 2015) was a Ukrainian politician. He was the Secretary of the City Council of Melitopol, Ukraine (2002–2010) and Mayor of Melitopol (2010–2015).

Biography 
Walter was born in 1958 in Melitopol, Zaporizhia Oblast, Ukraine. In 1975, he graduated from Melitopol high school number 11. From 1976–1980, he worked as a driver in the Melitopol enterprise "Agriculture", and in 1980–1981 he worked at Melitopol station and served in the military. From 1976–1979 Walter served two sentences in Berdyansk prison for embezzlement of state property.

On February 8, 2013, the decision of the court regarding Sergei Walter was dismissed by the mayor.

On February 25, 2015, Walter was found hanged at his home; he was to have appeared in court later that day on charges of corruption and criminal association.

His death was investigated as murder, but forensic experts were inclined towards a verdict of suicide. According to the press centre in the ATC Zaporizhia region, information on the case was brought in for Erdre ch. 1, Art. 115 of the Criminal Code of Ukraine (Murder).

Denis Korhogo Derzhobvynuvach stated that in light of the conclusions as to the cause of death, Sergei Walter's case is closed.

A civil memorial service for Walter was held at the house of culture in Melitopol on February 27.

References

External links 
 biography at kto.zp.ua 

1958 births
2015 deaths
Mayors of Melitopol
People from Melitopol
Party of Regions politicians
Suicides by hanging in Ukraine
Ukrainian politicians who committed suicide